Maurice Vautier (23 May 1901 – 15 October 1979) was a French pole vaulter. He competed at the 1924 Summer Olympics and finished eighth.

References

1901 births
1979 deaths
French male pole vaulters
Athletes (track and field) at the 1924 Summer Olympics
Olympic athletes of France
20th-century French people